Pushkar Sahu is a story, screenplay, dialogue writer who is best known as the writer of the television sitcom Saat Phero Ki Hera Pherie, the StarPlus show LOC - Life Out of Control, and the show Yes Boss that was aired on SAB TV.

Early career 

Pushkar Sahu was an assistant writer of Imtiyaaz Patel who wrote Ekta Kapoor's TV show Hum Paanch. He joined him after hum paanch and assisted a show called Aflaatoon, which was first Indian daily comedy show. While assisting he wrote story ideas for the show Office Office, and in that show, he wrote many episodes and stories.

Career 
In 2004 his concept LOC life out of control (based on India Pakistan) approved on Star Plus. The show was directed by Rajeev Mehra, with actor Sanjay Mishra, Manoj Pahwa in the lead role, and the show was shot in London.  In 2005, he wrote Paritosh Painter’s Home sweet home for Zee Smile and then Hukum mere aakaa for Sahara One. 
In 2007, he started writing the Adhikari brothers' already running show Yes Boss where he wrote the story, screenplay and dialogue.

In 2008 he was involved in the writing team of Inddmole’s Raju haazir ho, a show which was telecast on NDTV and hosted by Raju Shrivasteva; he was also part of the team of the SONY TV show Comedy circus session 1.

In 2010 he produced a daily comedy show, Darling I Love You Two, where he produced 80 episodes for Adhikari Brothers' channel Dabang and Dhamaal. in 2017 he produced Saas bahu & shaan patti for Shemaroo’s digital platform and Tata Sky. His latest writing work is SAB TV’s Saat pheron ki hera pherie, with Shekhar Suman and Ami Trivedi as the lead actors of this daily comedy show.

TV shows
Saat Phero Ki Hera Pherie (Sab TV Writer)
Yes Boss (TV series) (Sab TV Episode Writer)
Aflatoon (Sab TV assistant writer)
Idhar Dhamaal, Udhar Dhamaal (DD Metro Independent writer)
Sajan Re Jhoot Mat Bolo (Sab TV Episode Writer)
Office Office (Sab TV Story idea writer)
Hukum Mere Aakaa (Write 102 Episodes Sahara One) 
Sahab Biwi Ke Gulaam (Story Screenplay Sab TV) 
Mohalla Mohabaatwala(Episode Writer	Sab TV) 
Comedy Circus Season (Gags writer Sab TV) 
Gunwale Dulhania Le Jayenge (Story Screenplay Writer. Sab TV) 
Johny Aala Re (Gags Writer ZEE TV) 
Mahisagar (Story Screenplay BIG MAGIC) 
Chalti Ka Naam Gadhhi (Story Screenplay ZEE TV) 
Comedy Ghanta (Gags Writer Zee Smile) 
Home Sweet Home (Writer Zee Smile) 
Saat Pheron Ki Hera Pheri (Writer Sab TV) 
Akbar Birbal (Story Screenplay BIG MAGIC)
Raju Hazir Ho (Gags Writer NDTV IMAGIN) 
Comedy Club (Gags Writer Sab TV) 
LOC Life Out Of Control (Own Concept STAR PLUS)

Producer 
Darling I Love You Two (Adhikari Brothers channel: Dabang and Dhamaal)

References

External links 
 

Film directors from Mumbai
Hindi-language film directors
Living people
1980 births